Ophthalmoblapton is a plant genus of the family Euphorbiaceae first described as a genus in 1849. The entire genus is endemic to eastern Brazil.

Species
 Ophthalmoblapton crassipes Müll.Arg. - Bahia
 Ophthalmoblapton macrophyllum Allemão - Rio de Janeiro
 Ophthalmoblapton parviflorum Emmerich - Bahia
 Ophthalmoblapton pedunculare Müll.Arg. - Bahia, Minas Gerais, São Paulo, Rio de Janeiro

References

Euphorbiaceae genera
Euphorbioideae
Endemic flora of Brazil